Bani Mansour may refer to:
Bani Mansour (Amran), a sub-district of As Sudah District, Yemen
Bani Mansour (Ibb), a sub-district of Ba'dan District, Yemen
Bani Mansour (Sanaa), a sub-district of Al Haymah Al Kharijiyah District, Yemen